Shane Singe (born 13 March 1980) is a New Zealand former cricketer. He played two first-class matches for Auckland in 2003/04.

See also
 List of Auckland representative cricketers

References

External links
 

1980 births
Living people
New Zealand cricketers
Auckland cricketers
Cricketers from Auckland